ISTAT may refer to:
International Society of Transport Aircraft Trading
National Institute of Statistics (Italy) or Istituto Nazionale di Statistica
i-STAT, a blood analyzer made by Abbott Laboratories